Burkinabe Bolshevik Party (PBB) was a communist party in Burkina Faso. It was led by Hassane Dicko.

Communist parties in Burkina Faso
Defunct political parties in Burkina Faso